Theophilus of Alexandria may refer to:

 Theophilus I of Alexandria, ruled in 385–412
 Theophilus II (Coptic patriarch of Alexandria), ruled in 952–956
 Theophilus II (Greek patriarch of Alexandria), ruled in 1010–1020
 Theophilus III of Alexandria, Greek patriarch in 1805–1825

See also
Pseudo-Theophilus of Alexandria